Galloisiana yezoensis is a species of insect in the family Grylloblattidae that is endemic to Japan. Its type locality is Miyazaki Pass, Japan.

Range and habitat
It is found in montane habitats in central Hokkaido.

References

Grylloblattidae
Insects of Japan
Endemic fauna of Japan